Khaz-e Bahari (also Romanized as Khāz-e Bahārī) is a village in Eskelabad Rural District, Nukabad District, Khash County, Sistan and Baluchestan Province, Iran. At the 2006 census, its population was 10, in 7 families.

References 

Populated places in Khash County